The voiceless uvular-epiglottal plosive is a type of consonantal sound used in some spoken languages.

Features 
Features of the voiceless uvular-epiglottal plosive are:

 Its manner of articulation is occlusive, which means it is produced by obstructing airflow in the vocal tract. Since the consonant is also oral, with no nasal outlet, the airflow is blocked entirely, and the consonant is a plosive.
 Its place of articulation is uvular–epiglottal, which means that it is simultaneously articulated with the back part of the tongue (the dorsum) against the uvula and the epiglottis. The laryngeal closure is made and released slightly before the dorsal closure, but they overlap for most of their duration.
 Its phonation is voiceless, which means it is produced without vibrations of the vocal cords.
 It is an oral consonant, which means air is allowed to escape through the mouth only.
 It is a central consonant, which means it is produced by directing the airstream along the center of the tongue, rather than to the sides.
 The airstream mechanism is pulmonic, which means it is articulated by pushing air solely with the lungs and diaphragm, as in most sounds.

Occurrence

References 

Uvular consonants
Epiglottal consonants
Doubly articulated consonant
Pulmonic consonants